Glucksmann is a surname. Notable people include:

André Glucksmann (1937–2015), French philosopher, activist and writer
Christine Buci-Glucksmann, French philosopher
Heinrich Glücksmann (1864–1947), Moravian-born Austrian author
Max Glücksmann (1875–1946), Argentine Jewish pioneer of the music and film industries
Miriam Glucksmann, British sociologist
Raphaël Glucksmann, (born 1979), French politician, Member of European Parliament